Pakenham Meadows is a  biological Site of Special Scientific Interest north of Pakenham in Suffolk.

This unimproved and poorly drained meadow has a variety of soil types from loam to peat, and the vegetation types are correspondingly diverse. The herb-rich grassland has yellow rattle, bugle, fen bedstraw, oxe-eye daisy, ragged robin and southern marsh orchid.

A public footpath from Fen Road goes through the site.

References

Sites of Special Scientific Interest in Suffolk